Upwaltham is a scattered settlement and civil parish in the South Downs, in the District of Chichester of West Sussex, England.

The 2001 Census recorded a parish population of 25 people, living in 10 households. The scattered settlement is in a dry valley. Around the parish church are two farmsteads and two cottages. The barns of one of the farmsteads, Upwaltham House Farm, are now a conference and wedding venue.

From Benges the parish extends south as far as Jackdine Farm.

Public transport
Compass Bus route 99 between Petworth and Chichester serves Upwaltham six days a week, from Monday to Saturday. There is no service in the evening, or on Sunday or public holidays.

History
Prehistoric remains in the parish include a set of Bronze Age round barrows on Waltham Down in the north of the parish. Also Middle Bronze Age are the cross dykes on Upwaltham Hill.

"Waltham" is a common English place-name, derived from the Old English weald, meaning wood, and hām, meaning meadow or enclosure. The prefix "Up" indicates that it is higher than a neighbouring settlement.

From the Middle Ages onward, Upwaltham was in the hundred of Boxgrove in the Rape of Chichester. The Domesday Book of 1086 records it as having 11 households including one slave; resources included woodland, and land for ploughing and for pigs. There were two manors: one of six hides and the other of four.

At Church Farm, just west of the parish church, is a 17th-century barn. It has a timber queen post frame, weatherboarded walls and tiled roof. It is a Grade II* listed building.

Parish church
The Church of England parish church of St Mary the Virgin is now part of a combined Benefice with All Hallows, Tillington.

The church building is 12th-century Norman. The font and piscina are Norman. The font is plain, but the piscina seems to be made from a reused Norman column capital. The chancel is an apse, linked to the nave by a 13th-century pointed arch. Some of the windows and the arch for the south door are 14th-century. The porch and floor tiles are 19th-century. The church is a Grade I listed building.

Parish records of births and deaths from 1592 are held by the West Sussex Records Office.

Air crashes
There have been at least two notable air crashes in the parish. In 1944 an RAF Avro Lancaster crashed on Waltham Down. In 1945 a USAAF Douglas C-47 Skytrain crashed into Upwaltham Hill. In 1949 two RAF Gloster Meteors crashed in the area, one of them possibly in Upwaltham parish.

The Lancaster was from 617 Squadron at RAF Woodhall Spa in Lincolnshire. On 12 February 1944 it had landed at RNAS Ford on the way back from a mission, and on the morning of 13 February it took off to return to Woodhall Spa. There was low cloud and visibility was poor. The Lancaster hit trees on Waltham Down, broke up and caught fire.

Of the eight airmen aboard, seven were killed on impact. Local farmworkers rescued the pilot from the cockpit, but he was badly burned and died two days later in St Richard's Hospital in Chichester. The pilot and two other crewmen were from the Royal Canadian Air Force. Two other members of the crew were from the Royal Australian Air Force.

The Skytrain was from the 27th Transport Group. On 11 February 1945 it was on a flight from Paris–Le Bourget Airport to RAF Grove in Berkshire. It crossed the Sussex coast about 1125 hrs at an altitude of only . The aircraft's port wing hit trees on Upwaltham Hill and was torn off. The aircraft seems to have cartwheeled before breaking up. All seven men aboard were killed.

On 25 November 1949 two Gloster Meteor Mk IV aircraft of 43 Squadron at RAF Tangmere crashed on the South Downs, killing their pilots. Some reports suggest that one of the aircraft crashed in Upwaltham parish.

In 2009 an engraved stone plaque was unveiled in St Mary the Virgin parish church commemorating the 15 airmen killed in the Lancaster and Skytrain crashes.

References

Bibliography

 (Available at the church)

External links

Civil parishes in West Sussex
Aviation accidents and incidents locations in England